The men's discus throw at the 1978 European Athletics Championships was held in Prague, then Czechoslovakia, at Stadion Evžena Rošického on 2 and 3 September 1978.

Medalists

Results

Final
3 September

Qualification
2 September

Participation
According to an unofficial count, 20 athletes from 12 countries participated in the event.

 (1)
 (3)
 (2)
 (2)
 (1)
 (2)
 (1)
 (2)
 (1)
 (1)
 (2)
 (2)

References

Discus throw
Discus throw at the European Athletics Championships